Kaleigh Gilchrist (born May 16, 1992) is a dual sport athlete in surfing and water polo from Newport Beach, California. She competed on the gold medal-winning US Women's Olympic Team at the 2016 Summer Olympics contributing 6 goals.

In high school, (Newport Harbor High 2006-2010) she was part of the CIF winning water polo team during the 2008 season. She also represented the US Surf Team at 5 ISA World Championships. She won back-to-back Surfing America titles in 2009 and 2010 crowning her the best 18 and under female in America. She won another title as the NSSA high school champion. In 2010, she was the Orange County Register athlete of the year.

Gilchrist attended the University of Southern California majoring in Communication and minoring in Occupational Science. Gilchrist co-captained the 2013 NCAA Championship team. She also won a national title for USC at the NSSA collegiate championships. She was part of the Pi Beta Phi sorority.

Ambassador for The Young & Brave Foundation. Co-Founder of Camps4champs, Owner of I Miss South Central.

Competes on the World Surf League.

On July 27, 2019 Gilchrist suffered a serious laceration on her leg after a balcony collapse at a night club in Gwangju, South Korea.

See also
 United States women's Olympic water polo team records and statistics
 List of Olympic champions in women's water polo
 List of Olympic medalists in water polo (women)
 List of world champions in women's water polo
 List of World Aquatics Championships medalists in water polo

References

External links
 

1992 births
Living people
Sportspeople from Newport Beach, California
American female water polo players
Water polo drivers
Water polo players at the 2016 Summer Olympics
Medalists at the 2016 Summer Olympics
Olympic gold medalists for the United States in water polo
World Aquatics Championships medalists in water polo
Water polo players at the 2015 Pan American Games
Pan American Games medalists in water polo
Pan American Games gold medalists for the United States
Newport Harbor High School alumni
Medalists at the 2015 Pan American Games
Water polo players at the 2020 Summer Olympics
USC Trojans women's water polo players
Medalists at the 2020 Summer Olympics
American female surfers